Leth is a Danish surname. Notable people with the surname include:

Harald Leth (1899–1986), Danish painter
Jan Leth (1932–2010), Danish artist
Jørgen Leth (born 1937), Danish poet and film director
Julie Leth (born 1992), Danish cyclist
Marie Gudme Leth (1895–1997), Danish textile printer
Märtha Leth (1877–1954), Swedish pharmacist
Vera Leth (born 1958), Greenlandic ombudsman

Given name
Leth Graham (1894–1944), Canadian ice hockey player

Danish-language surnames